Seljeskog is a village in Salangen Municipality in Troms og Finnmark county, Norway.  It is located north of the village of Sjøvegan and northeast of the village of Skårvika.  It has a sports team, Seljeskog IL.

Canadian ski jumper Nels Nelsen was born here in 1894.

The Sami name is Salljavadda

References

Salangen
Villages in Troms